The Titan IIIA or Titan 3A was an American expendable launch system, launched four times in 1964 and 1965, to test the Transtage upper stage which was intended for use on the larger Titan IIIC. The Transtage was mounted atop two core stages derived from the Titan II. The Titan IIIA was also used as the core of the Titan IIIC.

The Titan IIIA made its first flight on 1 September 1964. However, the Transtage failed to pressurize, resulting in a premature cutoff and failure to reach orbit. A second test on 10 December was successful. Two further launches occurred in 1965 with Lincoln Experimental Satellites, before the Titan IIIA was retired.

Launch history

References

External links

Titan (rocket family)